Benthem may refer to:

 The original Low German and Dutch name for the castle, town or county of Bentheim.
 The surname Van Benthem
 Benthem v Netherlands, a legal case argued before the European Court of Human Rights.

For the English jurist and philosopher, see Jeremy Bentham.